"It's Going to Take Some Time" is a song written by Carole King and Toni Stern for King’s 1971 album, Music. It was redone by the Carpenters in 1972 for their fourth album, A Song for You. According to Richard Carpenter, he had to choose which songs he wanted to remake, and there was a big pile of 7-inch singles he had to listen to. When he encountered "It's Going to Take Some Time", he knew it would be a hit, and recorded it. The song peaked at number 12 on the Billboard Hot 100. Tim Weisberg played the bass flute, but the flute solo was played by Bob Messenger on a (standard) alto flute.

King is quoted as saying that the duo's lush, string-laden cover, including a flute solo, made her own more sparse version sound "like a demo".

According to musicologist James E. Perone, the lyrics describe someone recovering from a relationship that has ended.  They contrast the current situation, where the singer sings that "it's going to take some time this time" with her future recovery from the sadness.  Perone interprets the syncopations of much of the music as reflecting her recovery, but notes that the smoother, unsyncopated music at the end of each verse bring her back to the present day reality.

Actress Jessie Mueller, who portrayed King in the Broadway musical Beautiful: The Carole King Musical, regards "It's Going to Take Some Time" as one of her favorite King songs, adding that King "knows how to write a breakup song! She can encapsulate a feeling and mood so well, and with such depth and simplicity at the same time." 
 
Jazz organist Richard "Groove" Holmes recorded an instrumental version on his 1973 album Night Glider.

The band Dishwalla covered the song on the 1994 tribute album, If I Were a Carpenter.

Personnel
Karen Carpenterlead and backing vocals
Richard Carpenterbacking vocals, Wurlitzer electronic piano, piano, orchestration
Joe Osbornbass guitar
Hal Blainedrums
Bob Messengeralto flute & solo
Tim Weisbergbass flute

Chart performance

Weekly charts

Year-end charts

References

External links
 

1971 songs
1972 singles
Carole King songs
The Carpenters songs
Songs written by Carole King
Songs written by Toni Stern
A&M Records singles